Three ships of the Royal Navy have borne the name HMS Thalia, after Thalia, the name of a number of figures in Greek mythology, notably Thalia, one of the three Graces:

She was renamed HMS Thalia in 1783 and was broken up in 1814.
  was a 46-gun fifth rate launched in 1830 and broken up by 1867.
  was a  wooden screw corvette launched in 1869. She was converted to a 10-gun troop ship in 1886, a powder hulk in 1891 and a base ship in 1915. She was sold in 1920.

Royal Navy ship names